Benga is a surname. Notable people with the surname include:

Alexandru Benga (born 1989), Romanian footballer
Gheorghe Benga (born 1944), Romanian physician and molecular biologist
Ota Benga, pygmy best known for his time at the Bronx Zoo
Sokhna Benga (born 1967), Senegalese writer and poet